Stephen David Daldry CBE (born 2 May 1960) is an English director and producer of film, theatre, and television. He has won three Tony Awards for his work on Broadway and an Olivier Award for his work in the West End. He has received three Academy Awards nominations for Best Director, for the films Billy Elliot (2000), The Hours (2002), and The Reader (2008).

From 2016 to 2020, he produced and directed the Netflix television series The Crown, for which he received one Producers Guild Award nomination, one Producers Guild Award win, two Primetime Emmy Award nominations, and one Primetime Emmy Award win for Outstanding Directing for a Drama Series and Outstanding Drama Series. Daldry joined an elite group of directors by receiving nominations for direction in theatre, television, and film.

Early years 
Daldry was born in Dorset, the son of singer Cherry (née Thompson) and bank manager Patrick Daldry. The family moved to Taunton, Somerset, where his father died of cancer when Daldry was aged 14.

Daldry joined a youth theatre group in Taunton, Somerset. and performed as Sandy Tyrell in Hay Fever for the local amateur society, Taunton Thespians. At age 18, he won a Royal Air Force scholarship to read English at the University of Sheffield, where he became chairman of the Sheffield University Theatre Group.

After graduation, he spent a year travelling through Italy, where he became a clown's apprentice. He then trained as an actor on the postgraduate course at East 15 Acting School from 1982 to 1983, now part of the University of Essex.

Career 
Daldry began his career as an apprentice at the Sheffield Crucible from 1985 to 1988, working under artistic director Clare Venables. He also headed productions at the Manchester Library Theatre, Liverpool Playhouse, Stratford East, Oxford Stage, Brighton and the Edinburgh Fringe Festival. He was Artistic Director of the Royal Court Theatre from 1992–98, where he headed the £26 million development scheme. He was also Artistic Director of London's Gate Theatre (1989–92) and the Metro Theatre Company (1984–86). He is currently on the Board of the Young and Old Vic Theatres and remains an Associate Director of the Royal Court Theatre. He was the Cameron Mackintosh Visiting Professor of Contemporary Theatre for 2002 at St Catherine's College, Oxford.

Daldry made his feature film directorial debut with Billy Elliot (2000), which launched the film career of Jamie Bell. His next film was The Hours, which earned Nicole Kidman her first Best Actress win at the Academy Awards. He went on to direct a stage musical adaptation of Billy Elliot, and in 2009 his work earned him a Tony Award for Best Director of a Musical. He has also made a film version of The Reader (2008), based on the book of the same name and starring Kate Winslet, David Kross and Ralph Fiennes. The film won Best Actress at the Academy Awards for Kate Winslet. Daldry's fourth film was Extremely Loud & Incredibly Close, an adaptation of the book of the same name written by Jonathan Safran Foer, starring Tom Hanks, Sandra Bullock, and Max von Sydow. The screenplay was written by Eric Roth. The film received a nomination for Best Picture at the 84th Academy Awards and a nomination for von Sydow for Best Supporting Actor.

Daldry was initially slated to direct a Star Wars spin off film about the iconic Star Wars character Obi Wan Kenobi but the film was later scrapped due to the commercial failure of Solo: A Star Wars Story with Daldry saying the cancellation of the film crushed him and Hossein Amini. However, ideas from Daldry's originally planned film were repurposed for the Obi Wan Kenobi Disney + limited series  directed by Deborah Chow  and released in 2022 for which Daldry received credit as a consulting producer. In July 2022, it was revealed that Daldry would work with Sonia Friedman to develop a play based on the hit Netflix television show Stranger Things.

Personal life 
Daldry was in a relationship with set designer Ian MacNeil for 13 years. They met at an outdoor production of Alice in Wonderland in Lancaster in 1988, and after settling in Camberwell, began collaborating on theatrical productions.

Greatly impacted by the September 11 attacks in the United States, Daldry decided he wanted to start a family and married American performance artist and magazine editor Lucy Sexton, with whom he has a daughter. Despite this, he continues to refer to himself as gay because the public "don't like confusion."

Filmography

Film

Television

Theatre 
Broadway 

West End
The Audience with Helen Mirren, Gielgud Theatre (2013)
The Audience with Kristin Scott Thomas, Apollo Theatre (2015)
 The Inheritance, Noël Coward Theatre (2019)
 A Number, Royal Court Theatre
 Far Away (also Albery Theatre and New York Theatre Workshop)
 Via Dolorosa (also the Duchess Theatre)
 Rat in the Skull, RCT
 Body Talk, RCT
 The Kitchen, RCT
 The Editing Process, RCT
 Search And Destroy, RCT
 An Inspector Calls, Royal National Theatre
 Machinal, Royal National Theatre
 Billy Elliot: The Musical, Victoria Palace Theatre
 Skylight, Wyndham's Theatre

Detailed theatreography
 The Ragged Trousered Philanthropists, Liverpool Playhouse, Liverpool, England, then Theatre Royale, Stratford, England, 1988
 An Inspector Calls, York Theatre Royal, 1988
 Judgement Day, Old Red Lion Theatre, London, 1989
 Figaro Gets Divorced, Gate Theatre, London, 1990
 Cutting Room, Royal Court Theatre Upstairs, London, 1990
 Our Man in Marzibah and Rousseau's Tale (double-bill), Gate Theatre, 1991
 Damned for Despair, Gate Theatre, 1991
 Jerker, Gate Theatre, 1991
 (With Annie Castledine) Pioneers in Ingolstadt, Gate Theatre, 1991
 (With Annie Castledine) Purgatory in Ingolstadt, Gate Theatre, 1991
 Manon Lescaut, Dublin Grand Opera, 1992
 An Inspector Calls, National Theatre Company, Lyttelton Theatre, London, 1992, then Royale Theatre, New York City, 1994–1995, *later Garrick Theatre, London, 1995, finally Playhouse Theatre, London, 2016–17
 Search and Destroy, Royal Court Theatre Upstairs, 1993
 Machinal, National Theatre Company, Lyttelton Theatre, 1993
 The Europeans, 1993
 The Kitchen, Royal Court Theatre, 1994
 The Editing Process, Royal Court Theatre, 1994
 Rat in the Skull, Duke of York's Theatre, London, 1995
 The Libertine, Royal Court Theatre, 1995
 The Man of Mode, Royal Court Theatre, 1995
 Body Talk, Royal Court Theatre, 1996
 This Is a Chair, in London International Festival of Theatre, London, 1997
 Via Dolorosa (solo show), Royal Court Theatre, 1998, then Booth Theatre, New York City, 1999
 Far Away, Royal Court Theatre, 2000, then New York Theatre Workshop, New York City, 2002–2003
 A Number, Jerwood Theatre Downstairs, Royal Court Theatre, 2002, then New York Theatre Workshop, 2002–2003
 The Jungle, Young Vic, 2017–2018, then St. Ann's Warehouse, 2018

Awards and honours

References

External links 

 
 
 

1960 births
Living people
Alumni of East 15 Acting School
Alumni of the University of Sheffield
BAFTA winners (people)
Bisexual artists
Bisexual men
Commanders of the Order of the British Empire
Drama Desk Award winners
English film directors
English film producers
English theatre directors
Fellows of St Catherine's College, Oxford
Helpmann Award winners
Laurence Olivier Award winners
LGBT film directors
LGBT television directors
LGBT theatre directors
English LGBT people
People from Dorset
People from Taunton
Tony Award winners
English-language film directors
Primetime Emmy Award winners